Joseph Normand "Ti-Nomme" Dussault (September 26, 1925 – August 28, 2012) was a professional ice hockey player who played 206 games in the National Hockey League.

Dussault was born in Springfield, Massachusetts, where his father worked as an iceman. He moved to Sherbrooke, Quebec, when he was two years old. Dussault played for the Montreal Canadiens.

Dussault also played professional baseball as an outfielder, first with the Sherbrooke Canadians in 1946, then with the Sherbrooke Athletics (1948–1950), and finally with the Sherbrooke Indians in 1955.

References

External links 

1925 births
2012 deaths
American men's ice hockey left wingers
Baltimore Clippers (1945–49) players
Canadian ice hockey left wingers
Ice hockey players from Massachusetts
Ice hockey people from Quebec
Montreal Canadiens players
Sportspeople from Springfield, Massachusetts
Sportspeople from Sherbrooke
Baseball outfielders
Minor league baseball players
Sherbrooke Canadians players
Sherbrooke Athletics players
Sherbrooke Indians players
American emigrants to Canada